Fernando de Uranga or Fernando de Urango (died 1556) was a Roman Catholic prelate who served as Bishop of Santiago de Cuba (1550–1556).

Biography
Fernando de Uranga was born in Azpeitia, Spain.
On 4 July 1550, Fernando de Uranga was appointed during the papacy of Pope Julius III as Bishop of Santiago de Cuba.
In 1551, he was consecrated bishop. 
He served as Bishop of Santiago de Cuba until his death in 1556.

References

External links and additional sources
 (for Chronology of Bishops)  
 (for Chronology of Bishops) 

16th-century Roman Catholic bishops in Cuba
Bishops appointed by Pope Julius III
Year of birth unknown
1556 deaths
Roman Catholic bishops of Santiago de Cuba